The Postal Development Indicator was developed by the Universal Postal Union in 2012 to rank member countries according to various measures of an economic nature including gross national income, population, percentage of postal home delivery, and surface area of the country. The United Nations Economic and Social Council (ECOSOC) classifications of least developed countries (LDCs), Small Island Developing States (SIDS) and landlocked developing countries (LLDC) are
also taken into account.

References

Universal Postal Union
2012 in economics